Koulou is a rural commune in the Cercle of Kita in the Kayes Region of south-western Mali. The commune contains 8 villages and in the census of 2009 had a population of 10,416. The  principal village (chef-lieu) is Balia.

References

External links
.

Communes of Kayes Region